Call Me Elisabeth (French title: Je m'appelle Elisabeth) is a 2006 French drama film directed by Jean-Pierre Améris, and based on a novel written by Anne Wiazemsky.

Plot
Betty, ten years, is afraid of ghosts and dark corners. When her sister Agnes goes to boarding school, Betty finds herself alone with her parents Régis and Mado, and Rose, an almost silent housekeeper.  Her father is the director of an asylum next to their house, separated only by a wall.  A young patient, Yvon, escapes over the wall and hides in the family's garden, where Betty finds him.  Moved by his fragility, Betty hides Yvon for several days in the hut bike garden. She tells him everything she has on her heart, determined to make him her best friend and confidant. Yvon barely communicates. Yet gradually a bond of trust, and then a kind of friendship develop between them.

Cast
 Alba Gaïa Bellugi as Betty / Elisabeth
 Stéphane Freiss as Régis
 Maria de Medeiros as Mado
 Yolande Moreau as Rose
 Benjamin Ramon as Yvon
 Lauriane Sire as Agnès
 Virgil Leclaire as Quentin
 Olivier Cruveiller as The teacher

References

External links
 

2000s French-language films
2006 films
French drama films
2006 drama films
Films based on French novels
Films directed by Jean-Pierre Améris
Films scored by Philippe Sarde
2000s French films